M1946 may refer to:

 M1946 Sieg automatic rifle
 Halcón M-1946
 Madsen M/46
 130 mm towed field gun M1954 (M-46)